Simón Bolívar, Durango, Mexico  is a city and seat of the municipality of General Simón Bolívar, in the state of Durango, north-western Mexico. As of 2010, the town of General Simón Bolívar had a population of 1,321.

References

Populated places in Durango